Peter J. Rohrman (born February 9, 1970) is an American operations manager, Marine veteran, volunteer firefighter, volunteer coach, and political activist. A native of Carlstadt, New Jersey, he ran for Bergen County Freeholder in 2015 and 2016. Rohrman was the Libertarian Party nominee in New Jersey's 2017 gubernatorial election.

Background 
Rohrman was raised in Carlstadt, New Jersey and was a latchkey kid to a blue collar family. He describes football as instrumental in his growth as a student. He is a single father with two sons. He and his family reside in Ramsey, New Jersey.

He joined the U.S. Marine Corps and ascended to Infantry Platoon Sergeant in charge of 39 fellow Marines while serving in Operation Desert Storm. Rohrman went on to study computer science at Rutgers University in Newark. He has more than 10 years experience as an operations director for a large internet service provider. He has volunteered for over 20 years as a youth athletic coach and is a former volunteer firefighter.

Politics 
Rohrman ran for Bergen County Freeholder in both 2015 and 2016, receiving 8,691 votes in 2016.

Rohrman became the Libertarian nominee for the 2017 New Jersey gubernatorial election on March 11, 2017, during the New Jersey Libertarian Party State Convention. Rohrman's platform includes legalizing marijuana, tax reform, school choice, and ending corporate welfare. He believes that New Jersey should be a concealed-carry state and that all non-violent criminals in state prisons should be immediately pardoned. His running mate was Karrese Laguerre.

Rohrman sees drug addiction as a personal and public health issue, supports the legalization of marijuana, and supports the release of those imprisoned for non-violent drug crimes.

See also
 Libertarian Party (United States)

References

External links 
 
 Peter Rohrman at Ballotpedia

1970 births
Living people
Candidates in the 2017 United States elections
New Jersey Libertarians
People from Carlstadt, New Jersey
People from Ramsey, New Jersey
Rutgers University alumni